The NYCB Theatre at Westbury (originally known as the Westbury Music Fair) is an entertainment venue located in the hamlet of Jericho, outside of Westbury, New York. Constructed as a theatre in the round style with seating for 2,870  that was originally developed as a means to present top performers and productions of popular theatrical musicals at a series of venues located in suburban locations on the East Coast of the United States.

History
Radio broadcaster Frank Ford and nightclub owner Lee Guber were returning home with their wives after attending a 1954 musical performance presented in a tent. After the two kept commenting on how they could improve on the show they had just seen, Ford's wife told them "Well, why don't you". They went ahead with the idea, leading the creation of Music Fair Enterprises, Inc. Together with Shelly Gross, a television news anchor who had become disenchanted with his profession, the three raised $100,000 to lease the Devon, Pennsylvania site of what they named the Valley Forge Music Fair, which brought in profits exceeding $50,000 in its inaugural season in 1955.

An abandoned lime pit in Jericho, New York, a Long Island suburb of New York City, became the site of their second facility, the Westbury Music Fair. The original facility was an uninsulated blue-and-beige striped tent erected in 1956 that could accommodate 1,850, one of many similar tent-based theaters that existed nationwide in the mid-1950s. The tent was erected for $120,000 at a central Nassau County location conveniently located near the Northern State Parkway and the Wantagh State Parkway, though it was also on an approach path for planes landing at what later became John F. Kennedy International Airport, with noise from jet engines of planes overhead occasionally drowning out performers.

With Ford out of the picture, Gross and Guber constructed a theater on the site in 1966 that could fit 3,000 attendees. The new, permanent facility was a concrete building with carpeted floors and 3,000 metal director's chairs. Later, fully upholstered seats were installed. The facility was also climate controlled with heating and air conditioning. The building continued the theater in the round format used in the original tent, which offered clear and close views from all seats and a more intimate proximity to performers, while keeping down production costs as sets could be minimally designed.

In its first year, which featured such performances as a production of The King and I, the theater grossed $230,000. By 1976, revenue had grown more than 50-fold, to $13 million. Ticket prices that had started at $2.50 to $4.50 when the theater opened, had climbed to an average price of $8.75 by 1976.

SFX Entertainment acquired the facility in 1998, and it is now owned and operated by Live Nation. In 2005, North Fork Bank acquired three-year naming rights to the venue; becoming the North Fork Theatre in Westbury. In 2008, the bank was taken over by Capital One. On March 24, 2008, the theater was renamed the Capital One Bank Theatre at Westbury. After one year, Capital One dropped naming rights and the venue briefly became known as the Theatre at Westbury. New York Community Bank purchased naming rights in May 2010, with the theater being known as the NYCB Theatre in Westbury starting July 2010.

Among the stars and groups who performed at the suburban theater were The Doors, The Who, Alanis Morissette, The Supremes, The Pointer Sisters, Nina Simone, Chicago, Peter Cetera, Linda Ronstadt & the Stone Poneys, Sam the Sham & the Pharaohs, Eric Burdon & the Animals, Roger Whittaker, Johnny Mathis, Tony Bennett, Jack Benny, Milton Berle, George Carlin, Ray Charles, Bill Cosby, Johnny Carson, Sammy Davis Jr., Sergio Franchi, Alan Jones, Connie Francis, The Carpenters, Bobby Sherman, Steve Vai, Sam Kinison, Britney Spears, 'N Sync, Judy Garland, Bob Hope, Jonas Brothers, Liza Minnelli, Don Rickles, George Maharis, Vivian Blaine, Frankie Valli, Smokey Robinson, Kenny Rogers, John Serry Sr., Frank Sinatra, Jim Norton, Bruce Springsteen, Mike Tyson, Lena Horne, Stevie Wonder, Ringo Starr & His All-Starr Band, Bob Weir, RatDog, Chris Isaak, Jerry Seinfeld, Bob Saget, James Hunter, Styx, Vince Gill, Helen Reddy, Joan Rivers, Olivia Newton-John, Vanessa Williams, Gladys Knight, Mitzi Gaynor, Barbara Eden, Dom DeLuise, Paul Anka, Engelbert Humperdinck, Howie Mandel, Weird Al Yankovic & Video Games Live among others. The live tracks on Nina Simone's 1968 album 'Nuff Said! were recorded at the theater three days after the assassination of Martin Luther King Jr.

As a theater in the round, it is considered a suitable arena for professional wrestling, as Total Nonstop Action Wrestling has performed shows at the theater.

On April 20. 2014, Shelter Rock Church of Manhasset & Syosset held its Easter services at Theatre at Westbury to a capacity audience.

See also
House Of Blues

References

Theatres in New York (state)
Concert halls in New York (state)
Buildings and structures in Nassau County, New York
Tourist attractions in Nassau County, New York